Club Social y Deportivo Sacachispas is a professional football club based in Chiquimula, Guatemala.

The team plays in the Primera División de Ascenso, the second-highest football division in Guatemala. Their home stadium is the Estadio Las Victorias.

The club has also played in the Liga Mayor, having reached their best position in the 1995–96 season, when they were runners-up. They have been playing in the second division since 2021.

History
Nicknamed Los Muteros, the club was founded as a result of two meetings. The first, in the south-west corner of Ismael Cerna´s Park, was attended by the distinguished citizens Miguel Ángel Rodríguez, Josué Goshop, Héctor Antonio Monroy, Jorge González and Manuel Samayoa, on June 15, 1949; and the second meeting was near Colegio Amigos, where the Estadio Las Victorias now stands. Neftalí Aguilar, Caleb Goshop, Neco Velásquez, Enrique Valdés, Gata Cuellar, Ronald Williams, Mincho Paz, Lipe Franco, Quincho Díaz, Chentío Castañeda, Edmundo Rivera, Pío Martínez and Armando Portillo, and the people in the first meeting, were all at the second meeting.
The first uniform was a white jersey with white shorts. Their first coach was the Governor of Chiquimula, Colonel Guadalupe López Ochoa who got new uniforms: a white jersey with blue stripes, and white shorts.

The name
Many of the footballers had their headquarters in the Roxi barbershop, owned by Carlos Enrique Morales Hernández aka Quique. One night in a players' meeting, one customer who came from El Salvador told them about an Argentine movie showing in that country, Pelota de Trapo (Ball Rag). The movie was about a group of kids who play with the name Sacachispas. He suggested that name for the Chiquimula football team. That led to the current name of the Club Social y Deportivo Sacachispas.

Current squad

Notable former players
  Yony Flores
  Pablo Solórzano
  Marco Rivas
  Rigoberto Hernández 
  Allan Kardeck
  Diego Ávila 
  Leandro Rodríguez 
  Omar López
  Dany González

List of coaches
  Sergio Pardo
  Alejandro Larrea (2020–2021)
  Diego Cerruti (2021)
  Wilder Galicia (2021– )

Honours

National titles
Liga Mayor B: 1
1992

Segunda División: 2
1993
Torneo Clausura 2010

Copa Amistad: 1
2007

References

External links
Sacachispas.com 

Football clubs in Guatemala
Association football clubs established in 1949
1949 establishments in Guatemala